Royal Leamington Spa also known as Leamington Spa is a town in Warwickshire, England